The men's 50 metre freestyle swimming competition at the 1998 Asian Games in Bangkok was held on 11 December at the Thammasat Aquatic Center.

Schedule
All times are Indochina Time (UTC+07:00)

Results 
Legend
DNS — Did not start

Heats

Finals

Final B

Final A

References

External links
Official website

Swimming at the 1998 Asian Games